is a railway station in Itoshima, Fukuoka Prefecture, Japan. It is operated by JR Kyushu and is on the Chikuhi Line.

Lines
Only local services on the Chikuhi Line stop at this station.

Station layout 
The station consists of a side platform serving a single track. The station building is a modern structure in hashigami format. It resembles a vertical red barrel built over the track and houses the ticket window. From there a flight of steps leads down to the platform. There are two entrances to the barrel shaped station building. From the access road, a flight of steps leads up to the red barrel. A second entrance is located in the environs of a residential area south of the station on higher ground. Here the entrance is a yellow tube-shaped tunnel which leads to a fight of steps connecting to the red barrel. Unlike most hashigami designs, it is not possible to enter the station building from the other side of the tracks.

Management of the station has been outsourced to the JR Kyushu Tetsudou Eigyou Co., a wholly owned subsidiary of JR Kyushu specialising in station services. It staffs the ticket counter which is equipped with a POS machine but does not have a Midori no Madoguchi facility.

Adjacent stations

History
JR Kyushu opened the station on 28 October 1995 as an additional station on the existing track of the Chikuhi Line.

Passenger statistics
In fiscal 2016, the station was used by an average of 1,043 passengers daily (boarding passengers only), and it ranked 160th  among the busiest stations of JR Kyushu.

Environs
National Route 202
Itoshima City Maebaru Nishi Junior High School
Itoshima City Minamikaze Elementary School

See also
 List of railway stations in Japan

References

External links
Misakigaoka Station (JR Kyushu)

Railway stations in Japan opened in 1995
Chikuhi Line
Railway stations in Fukuoka Prefecture
Stations of Kyushu Railway Company